Seyfi Düzgören (1880 – 28 December 1948) was an officer of the Ottoman Army and a general of the Turkish Army.

See also
List of high-ranking commanders of the Turkish War of Independence

Sources

External links

1880 births
1948 deaths
Military personnel from Istanbul
Ottoman Military Academy alumni
Ottoman Military College alumni
Ottoman Army officers
Ottoman military personnel of the Italo-Turkish War
Ottoman military personnel of the Balkan Wars
Ottoman military personnel of World War I
Turkish Army generals
Turkish military personnel of the Turkish–Armenian War
Recipients of the Medal of Independence with Red Ribbon (Turkey)
Deputies of Mardin
People of the Dersim rebellion